Citi Movement (Griot New York) is an album by jazz trumpeter Wynton Marsalis that was released in 1992.

Track listing

Personnel 
 Wynton Marsalis – trumpet, arranger, liner notes
 Wycliffe Gordon – trombone
 Wessell Anderson – alto saxophone
 Todd Williams – soprano and tenor saxophone
 Eric Reed – piano
 Reginald Veal – double bass
 Herlin Riley – drums
 Herbert Harris – tenor saxophone
 Marthaniel Roberts – piano

Production
 Ron Carbo – conductor
 George Butler – executive producer
 Delfeayo Marsalis – producer
 Les Stephenson – engineer
 Patrick Smith – engineer, mixing
 William Johnson – assistant engineer
 Marian Conaty – assistant engineer
 Major Little – assistant engineer
 Earl Martin – assistant engineer
 Stanley Crouch – liner notes

References

Wynton Marsalis albums
Post-bop albums
Swing albums
Columbia Records albums